Los herederos del Monte (The Del Monte Dynasty) is a 2011 Spanish-language telenovela produced by Telemundo and RTI Colombia. Filming took place in Colombia, the series is a remake of the Chilean telenovela Hijos del Monte produced by TVN in 2008. The telenovela stars Marlene Favela, Mario Cimarro, José Luis Reséndez, Margarita Muñoz, Fabián Ríos, Jonathan Islas and Ezequiel Montalt.

Production 
The first teaser of the telenovela was released on Telemundo during the premiere of Aurora at 8pm/7c slot on 1 November 2010, replacing El Clon. Los Herederos del Monte replaced El Fantasma de Elena on the 9pm/8c slot, Telemundo aired the series during the 2011 season from Monday to Friday for 27 weeks. As with most of its other telenovelas, the network broadcasts English subtitles as closed captions on CC3.

Plot summary 
Five adopted brothers Juan, Jose, Pedro, Gaspar and Lucas see how their easygoing life in the countryside is changed by the death of their father Emilio del Monte, who gives part of his land to his only biological child Paula, who comes to claim what belongs to her. Paula begins to interfere with the close bond the brothers have, especially when some of them become attracted to her, especially Juan del Monte. They both fall in love which results in Juan leaving Julieta. But when Julieta gets pregnant, Juan marries her but not for love. Sadly, Julieta loses her baby and leaves Juan. As a result, Juan starts a relationship with Paula. However, Jose discovers Paula and her mother's lie, about not being Emilio's daughter, thus Jose blackmails Paula and force her to leave Juan. Paula leaves Juan but she finds out she is pregnant from Juan and she does not know what to do so she decides to leave the house. Julieta finds out she has a brain tumor and wants to get revenge on Paula for all the pain and misfortune she has caused in her life. Julieta attempts to kill Paula but she never does it. Modesto found out that Emilio did not die, instead, he planned everything to see how his sons were really like, if they were greedy. Emilio returns to the house with a new identity as Pablo Gonzalez and his presence causes chaos around the Del Monte house. It is revealed that Juan is technically Emilio's biological son and that he knew Paula was not his daughter. Jose kidnaps "Pablo", Paula and Adela but they are rescued by Juan. Emilio later dies but not before changing his will. Juan and Paula ended up being together, with Paula and her mother ended up accomplishing their goal of keeping the fortune of Del Monte family.

Cast 
Main cast in order of appearance

Secondary cast

Episodes

References

External links 
 Club de Noveleras 
 Seriesnow

2011 telenovelas
2011 American television series debuts
2011 American television series endings
2011 Colombian television series debuts
2011 Colombian television series endings
American television series based on telenovelas
Colombian telenovelas
RTI Producciones telenovelas
Spanish-language American telenovelas
Telemundo telenovelas
American television series based on Chilean television series